Gary David Kurt (born March 9, 1947 in Kitchener, Ontario) is a retired professional ice hockey goaltender.

Playing career
Kurt played Junior hockey for the Ontario Hockey Association's Kitchener Rangers, at the time owned by the New York Rangers. Later he played two seasons for the Rangers' affiliate in the Central Hockey League, the Omaha Knights. After the 1968–69 season he was acquired by the Cleveland Barons of the American Hockey League.

After another two seasons in the AHL he broke into the NHL with the California Golden Seals, who acquired his rights from the Barons prior to the 1971–72 NHL season. He spent the first half of the season playing for the Golden Seals' affiliate Baltimore Clippers, but was called up to the Seals in January 1972 to replace Lyle Carter as Gilles Meloche's back-up. In February he was chosen by the new World Hockey Association's New York Raiders in their player draft. After completing his season with California he defected to the new league.

Kurt spent the following two seasons with the Raiders/Golden Blades/Jersey Knights franchise, backing-up Pete Donnelly and Joe Junkin, playing alongside former Seals Brian Perry, Bobby Sheehan, Kent Douglas, Mike Laughton and Norm Ferguson. He was chosen by the Phoenix Roadrunners in the 1974 WHA Expansion Draft, and finally given the chance to be starting goaltender for a major professional team.

His first season with the Roadrunners was his most successful professional one, winning 25 games and leading the Roadrunners to a playoff berth, but they were quickly dismissed by the Quebec Nordiques. The following season he shared goaltending duties with Jack Norris, and by 1976 he was once again relegated to being a back-up. At the end of the season he retired.

Awards
 1971 AHL First All-Star Team
 1971 Harry "Hap" Holmes Memorial Award
 1974 NAHL First All-Star Team

Career statistics

Regular season and playoffs

References

External links
 

1947 births
Living people
Baltimore Clippers players
California Golden Seals players
Canadian expatriate ice hockey players in the United States
Canadian ice hockey goaltenders
Cleveland Barons (1937–1973) players
Ice hockey people from Ontario
Jersey Knights players
Kitchener Rangers players
New York Golden Blades players
New York Raiders players
Oklahoma City Blazers (1965–1977) players
Omaha Knights (CHL) players
Ontario Hockey Association Senior A League (1890–1979) players
Phoenix Roadrunners (WHA) players
Sportspeople from Kitchener, Ontario